Aunegrenda is a village in the municipality of Holtålen in Trøndelag county, Norway. Aunegrenda lies 6,990 km north of the equator and 571 km east of the prime meridian. Most of the 50 residents of the village work in agriculture or commute to other places to work.

References

Holtålen
Villages in Trøndelag